Epicondyle of the humerus may refer to:

 Lateral epicondyle of the humerus
 Medial epicondyle of the humerus